Latakia Sports City Stadium is a multi-purpose stadium in Latakia, Syria. It is mostly used for football matches. With a capacity of 45,000 spectators, the stadium is the second largest sports venue in Syria. It was opened in 1987 as a part of the Latakia Sports City and became the main venue of the 10th Mediterranean Games in Latakia (1987).

See also
List of football stadiums in Syria

Sports venues completed in 1987
Football venues in Syria
Buildings and structures in Latakia
Multi-purpose stadiums in Syria
Sport in Latakia